Nina Petronzio (born 15 October 1979) is a Canadian American interior and furniture designer, and actress. An ASID Industry member, she is best known for her high-end, Transitional style interior designs  and Plush Home furniture line.

Childhood
Nina Petronzio was born in Victoria County, Nova Scotia, Canada, to New York artists who were inspired to open an art foundry after her father, bronze sculptor Robertino Petronzio returned from his studies at the prestigious Accademia di Belle Arti Firenze in Florence, Italy.

At age eleven, she was cast to play the female lead character, Jo, in the film Vincent and Me. Tcheky Karyo played the role of Vincent van Gogh. The film was shot in the Netherlands, France and Quebec, and her performance won her a nomination for a Genie Award for Best Performance by an Actress in a Leading Role (1991). At the time, Petronzio was the youngest actor to ever have been nominated for a Genie Award. The film's small screen release in the United States by Disney was awarded an Emmy for Outstanding Children's Special.

Her travels for the European release and film festival circuit of Vincent and Me introduced her to a sensibility of fashion, architecture, and style that she had not yet been exposed to in the woods of Nova Scotia.  Visiting her ancestral Italy, where her father learned sculpture, is what initially piqued Nina's interest in interior design, home building, and furniture.

Design career

Petronzio founded her Melrose Avenue interior design firm and furniture line, Plush Home in West Hollywood, California, with her husband Steven Ho in 2003. Known for her celebrity and discerning clientele, Petronzio is well known for her high-end, transitional style interior and furniture designs, fabric selections, and custom home plans. She has designed private projects for Mark Wahlberg, Leonardo DiCaprio, Neve Campbell, James Franco. Her work has been praised and featured in publications ranging from Elle Decor to The Franklin Report.

Production Designers have specified Petronzio's furniture line in their film and television projects, including Spider-Man 2, Mission: Impossible 2, Curb Your Enthusiasm (2009), Nip/Tuck, The Island and Heroes.

Personal life
She is married to martial artist Steven Ho, and they have two sons together.

Filmography
Petronzio has acted on several occasions, including her acclaimed performance in Vincent and Me.

References

External links

Plush Home, Inc.
Official Blog
ASID Los Angeles
Franklin Report

American interior designers
American furniture designers
American people of Italian descent
American film actresses
American child actresses
1979 births
Living people
People from Victoria County, Nova Scotia
American people of Canadian descent
Canadian people of American descent
Canadian people of Italian descent
American women interior designers
Canadian interior designers
Canadian furniture designers
Canadian film actresses
Canadian child actresses
Actresses from Nova Scotia